Michael D. Escobar is an American biostatistician.

Escobar earned a degree in liberal arts at Tufts University in 1981 followed by a doctorate in statistics at Yale University in 1988. Between 1990 and 1994, he was an assistant professor at Carnegie Mellon University. Escobar subsequently joined the University of Toronto faculty. In 2015, he was elected a fellow of the American Statistical Association.

References

American statisticians
Yale University alumni
Year of birth missing (living people)
Tufts University School of Arts and Sciences alumni
Living people
Fellows of the American Statistical Association
Biostatisticians
Academic staff of the University of Toronto
Carnegie Mellon University faculty
American expatriates in Canada